Fierro is a Spanish and Italian surname and middle name.

Fierro may also refer to:

Fierro (film), an Argentinian animated film released November 2007
Fierro Group, a Spanish economic group
San Fierro, San Andreas, a fictional city

See also
 Fiero (disambiguation)